Nick Walters is a British writer. He has written many spin off novels based on the BBC science fiction television series Doctor Who, as well as cowriting one featuring Bernice Summerfield.

Work

Virgin New Adventures
Dry Pilgrimage (With Paul Leonard) (1998)

Past Doctor Adventures
Superior Beings (2001)

Eighth Doctor Adventures
Dominion (1999)
The Fall of Yquatine (2000)
Reckless Engineering  (2003)

Lethbridge-Stewart Novels
Mutually Assured Domination  (2015)
The Man from Yesterday (2017)
The Danger Men (2018)

External links
Nick Walters' BBC page
Autobiographical article by Nick Walters

British writers
Living people
Writers of Doctor Who novels
Year of birth missing (living people)